The 1956 Akron Zips football team was an American football team that represented the University of Akron in the Ohio Athletic Conference (OAC) during the 1956 NCAA College Division football season. In its third season under head coach Joe McMullen, the team compiled a 3–5–1 record (3–5–1 against OAC opponents) and outscored opponents by a total of 216 to 171. Jerry Reeves and John Williams the team captains. The team played its home games at the Rubber Bowl in Akron, Ohio.

Schedule

References

Akron
Akron Zips football seasons
Akron Zips football